Line 5 may refer to:

Public transport

Asia

China
 Line 5 (Beijing Subway)
 Line 5 (Changsha Metro)
 Line 5 (Chengdu Metro)
 Line 5 (Chongqing Rail Transit)
 Line 5 (Fuzhou Metro)
 Line 5 (Guangzhou Metro)
 Line 5 (Hangzhou Metro)
 Line 5 (Kunming Metro)
 Line 5 (Nanning Metro)
 Line 5 (Ningbo Rail Transit)
 Line 5 (Shanghai Metro)
 Line 5 (Shenzhen Metro)
 Line 5 (Suzhou Rail Transit)
 Line 5 (Tianjin Metro)
 Line 5 (Wuhan Metro)
 Line 5 (Xi'an Metro)
 Line 5 (Zhengzhou Metro)

India
 Line 5 (Chennai Metro), or Red line, under construction in India
 Line 5 (Delhi Metro), or Green Line
 Line 5 (Mumbai Metro)
 Kolkata Metro Line 5

Japan
 Sennichimae Line, Osaka
 Tokyo Metro Tozai Line

Other Asian countries
 Tehran Metro Line 5, Iran
 Kelana Jaya line, Kuala Lumpur, Malaysia
 Makati Intra-city Subway, Makati, Philippines (under construction)
 North South MRT line, Singapore
 Seoul Subway Line 5, South Korea

Australia
 Cumberland Line, Sydney, New South Wales

Europe

France
 Île-de-France tramway Line 5
 Paris Métro Line 5

Italy
 Circumflegrea railway, Naples
 Milan Metro Line 5

Russia
 Koltsevaya line, Moscow
 Line 5 (Saint Petersburg Metro)

Spain
 Barcelona Metro line 5, Spain
 Line 5 (Madrid Metro), Spain
 Line 5 (Metro Bilbao), Spain (under study)

Other European countries
 U5 (Vienna U-Bahn), Austria (planned)
 Brussels Metro line 5, Belgium
 U5 (Berlin U-Bahn), Germany
 Metro Line M5 (Budapest Metro), Hungary
 Tramlijn 5 (Amsterdam), Netherlands
 Bucharest Metro Line M5, Romania
 S5 (ZVV), Zurich, Switzerland
 Livoberezhna line (Kyiv Metro), Ukraine (rejected)
 Vyshhorodsko–Darnytska line, Kyiv, Ukraine (proposed)

North America

Canada
 Line 5 Eglinton, Toronto (under construction)
 Blue Line (Montreal Metro), formerly Line 5

United States
 Route 5 (MTA Maryland), a bus route
 5 (New York City Subway service)
 5 (Los Angeles Railway) (defunct)

Other North American countries
 Line 5, on the Havana Suburban Railway, Cuba
 Mexico City Metro Line 5, Mexico
 Line 5 (Panama Metro) (planned)

South America
 Line 5 (São Paulo Metro), Brazil
 Santiago Metro Line 5, Chile
 Lima Metro, Peru (planned)

Other uses
 Enbridge Line 5, a Canadian oil pipeline
 Regiment Liberation - 5th of the Line, a Belgium line infantry regiment